The Watermill at Gennep (Dutch: Genneper Watermolen) is a watermill along the river Dommel, located on the Genneperweg 143 in Gestel, Eindhoven, in the province of North Brabant, Netherlands. First mentioned in the 13th century, the watermill burned down and was rebuilt in 1587.

Vincent van Gogh lived nearby and made several paintings while in the area, including four paintings of the mill in 1884. The watermill was listed as a national monument in 1972.

History 

The gristmill was first mentioned in a document in the 13th century, donating the mill to the Postel Abbey in Mol, Belgium. It was a banmolen (nl), meaning peasants in the locality were obligated to use this mill to grind their wheat.

Description 

The Watermill at Gennep is situated along the river Dommel.

Modern day 
The mill was listed as a national monument (nr 14639) on 15 August 1972.

Notes

References

External links 

Water Mill at Gennep, Vincent van Gogh Gallery

Buildings and structures completed in the 13th century
Watermills in the Netherlands
Watermills in North Brabant
Rijksmonuments in North Brabant
Buildings and structures in Eindhoven